John Nelson (born 3 May 1975) is a New Zealand cricketer. He played in two List A matches for Central Districts in 2001/02.

See also
 List of Central Districts representative cricketers

References

External links
 

1975 births
Living people
New Zealand cricketers
Central Districts cricketers
Cricketers from Blenheim, New Zealand